Shantanu (Sanskrit: शांतनु) is a character in the Mahabharata, described as the ruler of the Kuru Kingdom with his capital at Hastinapura. He was a descendant of the Bharata race, a forebear of the lineage of the Lunar dynasty, and the great-grandfather of the Pandavas and the Kauravas.  

The ruler was the youngest son of King Pratipa of Hastinapura and had been born during the latter's latter years. His eldest brother, Devapi, had leprosy, and had given up his inheritance to become a hermit. The middle son, Bahlika, (or Vahlika) abandoned his paternal kingdom, and had started living with his maternal uncle in Balkh, subsequently inheriting his kingdom. Shantanu, thus, ascended the throne of Hastinapura. 

He is best known for being the father of Bhishma (also known as Devavrata), among the mightiest warriors of the epic.

Etymology

The meaning of the name can be explained by nirukti available in Adi Parva, through which Sri Nityānanda Miśra elaborates its meaning as "the one who amplifies sukha (happines) for others". Monier-Williams translates śaṁ-tanu as "wholesome for the body".

The Sambhava Parva of Mahabharata says that the old men of his kingdom who were touched by this monarch not only felt an indescribable sensation of pleasure but also became restored to youth. Therefore, this monarch was called Santanu.

Brahma's curse and the birth of Shantanu

In his previous birth, there was a powerful king of the Ikshvaku dynasty named Mahabhisha. He possessed many virtuous qualities, and after performing a thousand Ashvamedha Yagnas and a hundred Rajasuya Yagnas (to qualify as emperor), he had attained heaven after his death. Once he got an opportunity to visit the court of Brahma where all the Devas and the Ganga were also present. While the celestials were worshipping Brahma, a wind blew and displaced Ganga's clothes revealing her body. Everybody present there bent their heads except Mahabhisha who kept gazing at her. Upon seeing this act, Brahma lost his temper and cursed him to be born a mortal. Ganga who also relished the mortal act was cursed to be born as human and come back only after breaking Mahabhisha's heart. Mahabhisha then requested Brahma that he, Mahabhisha, be born as the son of Kuru king Pratipa and his wish was granted by Brahma.

The Kuru king Pratipa was once meditating. At that time Ganga took the form of a beautiful woman, approached the king and sat on his right thigh. When he asked her what she wanted, Ganga requested him to become her husband. Pratipa however refused since he had taken a vow not to lust for anybody, and also that she had sat on his right thigh and according to traditions a man's right thigh was for his daughter or daughter-in-law while the left thigh was for his wife. He then proposed that she marry his son, to which she agreed.

A child was born to Pratipa and his wife Sunanda in their old age. He was named Shantanu because when he was born his father had controlled his passions by ascetic penances. Pratipa then installed Shantanu as king of Hastinapura and retired into the woods to perform penances. Bahlika who was elder than Shantanu also gave permission to him for becoming the king of Hastinapura.

Marriage with Ganga

Shantanu saw a beautiful woman on the banks of the river Ganga and asked her to marry him. She agreed but with one condition: that Shantanu would never ask any questions about her actions. They married and later she gave birth to a son. But she drowned the child. Shantanu could not ask her the reason, because of his promise, lest she would leave him. One by one, seven sons were born and drowned by Ganga.

When Ganga was about to drown the eighth son, Shantanu, devastated, could not restrain himself and confronted her. Finally, Ganga explained to King Shantanu about Brahma's curse given to Mahabhisha and her. Then she told him that their eight children were Eight Vasu's who were cursed by Vasishtha to be born on earth as mortal humans. However, when they pacified him, he limited his curse and told them that they would be freed from this curse upon their birth as humans. So she released the seven of them from human life by drowning them all. However, the Vasu Dyaus was cursed to live a long life and not to have a wife or have children. But the sage Vashishtha also gave a boon to him that he would be virtuous, conversant with all the holy scriptures and will be an obedient son to his father.  Ganga said she would take him to train him properly for the King's throne and status. With these words, she disappeared along with the child while Shantanu was struck with grief thinking about spending the rest of his life without her.

Reunion with his son

Shantanu, filled with grief from the loss of his wife and son, began to practise Brahmacharya and ruled his kingdom extremely well. By merely adopting virtuous behaviour, Shantanu was easily able to conquer the entire world without lifting weapons. All the kings declared Shantanu as Emperor and his reign was a peaceful one. Shantanu gave up hunting and gained popularity from his subjects.

One day, while walking along the banks of the Ganga, Shantanu saw that the river had become shallow. While searching for the cause of this phenomenon, he came across a handsome young boy who had checked the river's flow with his celestial weapon. The young boy was his son, however, he didn't recognize him because he could see him only for a few moments after he was born. The boy recognized that he was his father, however, he didn't reveal it to him instead he disappeared from his sight using his power of illusion. Shantanu upon seeing this wondered whether the boy was actually his son and called upon Ganga to show the boy to him. Ganga having thus appeared revealed to him that the boy was actually his son Devavrata and that he was taught the knowledge of the holy scriptures by the sage Vasishtha and the art of warfare by Parshurama. After revealing the truth about Devavrata she told Shantanu to take him to Hastinapura. Upon reaching the capital Shantanu crowned Devavrata as the heir-apparent to the throne.

Although Shantanu was pained from his separation from Ganga, he was overjoyed upon receiving such an accomplished son. He performed seven Ashvamedha Yagnas on the banks of Yamuna with the help of Devavrata.

Marriage with Satyavati

Four years later, Shantanu while travelling near the banks of Yamuna smelled a sweet scent coming from an unknown direction. While searching for the cause of the scent, he came across Satyavati from whom the smell of scent was coming. Satyavati was an adopted daughter of the chief of the fishermen of her village. Upon seeing her, Shantanu fell in love with her and desired to marry her. Upon asking for his consent, her father agreed to the marriage on the condition that Satyavati's son would inherit the throne of Hastinapura.

King Shantanu was unable to give his word on accession as his eldest son Devavrata was the heir to the throne and was forlorn. Devavrata, however, realised the cause of his sorrowm and for the sake of his father, gave his word to the chief that he would renounce all his claims to the throne, in favour of Satyavati's children. To reassure the skeptical chief further, he also vowed lifelong celibacy to ensure that future generations borne of Satyavati would also not be challenged by his offspring. Upon hearing this vow he immediately agreed to the marriage of Satyavati and Shantanu. Devavrata was named as Bhishma (one who has taken a terrible vow) by the celestials because of the terrible oath he took. Upon returning with Satyavati to Hastinapura he told about his vow to his father. Upon hearing about this Shantanu became highly impressed and gave him a boon that he will only die if he wants to. Shantanu and Satyavati went on to have two sons, Chitrāngada and Vichitravirya. After Shantanu's death, Chitrangada became king of Hastinapur.

Literature
van Buitenen, J.A.B. (1973), Mahabharata, vol. 1, Chicago, The University of Chicago Press, pp. 216–230
Shastri Chitrao, M.M.S. (1964), Bharatavarshiya Prachin Charitrakosha (Dictionary of Ancient Indian Biography, in Hindi), pp. 962–63

References

See also

Characters in the Mahabharata
Ancient Indian people